The Reserve Independent School District is a school district headquartered in Reserve, New Mexico.

It includes the southern portion of Catron County. Communities in the district include, in addition to Reserve: Alma, Apache Creek, Aragon, Cruzville, Glenwood, Lower Frisco, Luna, Middle Frisco, Mogollon, Pleasanton, Rancho Grande, and Rivers.

References

External links
 Reserve Independent School District

School districts in New Mexico
Education in Catron County, New Mexico